The 2022 Bowls England National Finals are a series of lawn bowls events to determine the National champions of England. The Championships are being held from 25 August to 11 September 2022, at the Royal Leamington Spa Bowls Club in Victoria Park, Leamington Spa. They are organised by Bowls England, and are open to lawn bowlers who qualify via their County Championships.

Sam Tolchard successfully defended his two wood singles title. Rebecca Moorbey became only the second woman (after Sophie Tolchard) to secure both the women's singles and women's junior singles titles.

In the elite pairs events, Nick Brett won his second national title partnering Lewis Baker and Sophie Tolchard won her eighth title partnering Harriet Stevens.

On 8 September 2022, play for 9 September was suspended due to the death of Elizabeth II.

Results summary

Elite events

Other events

Team events

References

Bowls in England
2022 in English sport
August 2022 sports events in the United Kingdom
September 2022 sports events in the United Kingdom